Osmond Charles William Fuhrman  (19 July 188910 November 1961) was an Australian public servant and diplomat.

In November 1949 Fuhrman was appointed the first Australian Minister to Israel. He presented his credentials in Tel Aviv in January 1950.

References

1889 births
1961 deaths
Australian Officers of the Order of the British Empire
Consuls-General of Australia in Shanghai
Ambassadors of Australia to Israel